Publius Aquillius Gallus was a tribune of the plebs in 55 BC. With his colleague Gaius Ateius Capito, Aquillius Gallus opposed the Lex Trebonia and the plans regarding proconsular commands for Crassus and Pompeius. Crassus's war against Parthia resulted in one of the worst defeats ever suffered by a Roman army, the Battle of Carrhae.

References

Tribunes of the plebs
1st-century BC Romans
Year of birth missing
Year of death missing
Place of birth missing
Gallus, Publius